Carrabelle River is located in Carrabelle, Florida, and flows into St. George Sound in Apalachicola Bay and the Gulf of Mexico. The area has been a base for commercial fishermen. It is home to a river festival. It is crossed by the Carrabelle River Bridge on U.S. Route 98. Upstream, the Carrabelle forks into the New River and Crooked River.

References

Rivers of Franklin County, Florida
Rivers of Florida